Qualifications of Men was a Korean reality-variety show that aired on KBS2 from March 29, 2009 to April 7, 2013 as one of two segments in Happy Sunday.

Subtitled "101 Things a Man Must Do Before He Dies," the show involved a group of male celebrities of different ages and personalities who take on missions that would make them a "real man." The missions range from physical to emotional, and they meet and learn skills from many mentors in different areas.

Cast

Former
 Lee Kyung-kyu (March 29, 2009 ~ April 7, 2013)
 Kim Gook-jin (March 29, 2009 ~ April 7, 2013)
 Kim Tae-won (March 29, 2009 ~ April 7, 2013)
 Lee Yoon-seok (March 29, 2009 ~ April 7, 2013)
 Yoon Hyung-bin (March 29, 2009 ~ April 7, 2013)
 Kim Jun-ho (July 15, 2012 ~ April 7, 2013)
 Joo Sang-wook (July 15, 2012 ~ April 7, 2013)
 Kim Sung-min (March 29, 2009 ~ November 28, 2010)
 Lee Jung-jin (March 29, 2009 ~ May 8, 2011)
 Yang Joon-hyuk (April 10, 2011 ~ July 8, 2012)   
 Jun Hyun-moo (May 8, 2011 ~ July 8, 2012)

Mentors
 Episode 1 ~ 3 (Marry twice, Anti-smoking education) : Lee Oi-soo
 Episode 4 ~ 5, 10 (Going to an army twice, Tears) : Nam Jin
 Episode 6 ~ 7 (Nursing a child) : Park Sa-rang
 Episode 12 (Debating) : Kim Sung-soo
 Episode 13 ~ 14 (Knowledge) : Park Jee-seon
 Episode 15 (Paragliding) : Kwon Chang-jin
 Episode 17 ~ 18 (Creating an UCC) : Yoo Se-yoon, 2PM
 Episode 18 ~ 19 (Bicycle trip) : Yoo Se-yoon
 Episode 22 (Wakeboarding) : Lee Kyung-kyu
 Episode 47, 56, 67 ~ 68 (Making a band) : Kim Tae-won
 Episode 63 ~ 65, 70 ~ 74 (Choir) : Kolleen Park 
 Episode 93, 121, 135 (Tap dance) : Tap trainer Lee Jung-kwon

5 major plans

2010
 Hiking Jirisan (completed)
 Get licenses (completed)
 Backpacking (Delayed to 2011)
 Forming a Band (completed)
 Watching the World Cup (completed)

2011
 Backpacking (May 16 ~ 26, West Australia, completed)
 Having a new hobby (Tap Dancing completed)
 Creating a short film (completed)
 Samul nori (completed)
 Becoming a CEO (completed)

History
As part of Happy Sunday, Qualifications of Men replaced the second season of Immortal Music Classics in late March 2009. In the early episodes, the cast joked that their primary aim was not to disturb the ratings of sister segment 2 Days & 1 Night.

The original cast included the main MC Lee Kyung-kyu, who made his comeback into the Korean TV industry with this show; Kim Gook-jin, a comedian who previously attempted to become a professional golfer; Kim Tae-won, leader of the legendary rock-ballad band Boohwal; Lee Yoon-seok, a comedian known for his doctor's degree and conversely his ridiculously weak strength (though since joining the show, Kim Tae-won took over his title of "Weakling of the nation"); Yoon Hyung-bin, a comedian from the show Gag Concert; and actors Lee Jung-jin and Kim Sung-min.

The cast went through a variety of physically and emotionally taxing missions, usually spanning over 24 hours, performing the likes of serving mandatory military service again, crying, becoming employees of random companies, not smoking for a day, wake-boarding, singing in a choir, participating in an amusement park parade show, and forming an amateur band. The most memorable moment for the program was when 2 of the members (Kim Gook-jin and Kim Sung-min) was selected as a guest for the United States Air Force Thunderbirds Acrobatic Team, during their 2009 Far East Tour at Osan Air Base, in South Korea. For the Choir episodes, both of the Choir teams won awards (with guest Kolleen Park and Kim Tae-won as conductors).

In late 2010, Kim Sung-min was dropped from the program after being arrested for drug use. He was sentenced to 2 years and 6 months in prison for meth use and smuggling, suspended for 4 years.

On April 10, 2011, Korean baseball legend Yang Joon-hyuk (he currently holds the records for home runs, RBI, and best batting average) made his debut as a member of the show.

On May 8, 2011, Lee Jung-jin appeared in his final episode and Jun Hyun-moo became the newest and 7th member of the show. Jun is a KBS news announcer and reporter known for his variety and comedic skills (particularly for his parody of SHINee's "Lucifer" dance).

On July 31, 2012, Yang Joon-hyuk and Jun Hyun-moo left the show, and 2 new members—actor Joo Sang-wook and Gag Concert comedian Kim Jun-ho—joined the crew.

Qualifications of Men initially maintained good ratings; in 2009, it placed second among the most viewed Sunday night programs for 16 weeks with more than 30% viewership ratings. But after four years on air, ratings dropped, until it was overtaken in popularity by MBC's Dad! Where Are We Going?, which premiered in 2013. KBS cancelled the show, and it aired its last episode on April 7, 2013. With its cancellation, the show's raison d'être was unfinished, with the program coming to a close before the cast members were able to finish filling out the list of 101 things, only getting up to #94.

Broadcasting times

Awards

References

External links
Happy Sunday official KBS website 
Qualifications of Men at KBS World

South Korean reality television series
Television series by SM C&C